The pyramid of Djoser (or Djeser and Zoser), sometimes called the Step Pyramid of Djoser, is an archaeological site in the Saqqara necropolis, Egypt, northwest of the ruins of Memphis. The 6-tier, 4-sided structure is the earliest colossal stone building in Egypt. It was built in the 27th century BC during the Third Dynasty for the burial of Pharaoh Djoser. The pyramid is the central feature of a vast mortuary complex in an enormous courtyard surrounded by ceremonial structures and decoration. Its architect was Imhotep, chancellor of the pharaoh and high priest of the god Ra.

The pyramid went through several revisions and redevelopments of the original plan. The step pyramid (or proto-pyramid) was considered to be the earliest large-scale cut stone construction made by man as of 1997, although the nearby enclosure wall "Gisr el-Mudir" is suggested by some Egyptologists to predate the complex, and the South American pyramids at Caral are contemporary.

In March 2020, the pyramid was reopened for visitors after a 14-year restoration.

Djoser 

Djoser was the first or second king of the 3rd Dynasty (c. 2670–2650 BC) of the Egyptian Old Kingdom (c. 2686–2125 BC). He is believed to have ruled for 19 years or, if the 19 years were biennial taxation years, 38 years. He reigned long enough to allow the grandiose plan for his pyramid to be realized in his lifetime.

Djoser is best known for his innovative tomb,  which dominates the Saqqara landscape. In this tomb he is referred to by his Horus name Netjerikhet; Djoser is a name given by New Kingdom visitors thousands of years later. Djoser's step pyramid is astounding in its departure from previous architecture. It sets several important precedents, perhaps the most important of which is its status as the first monumental structure made of stone.

The social implications of such a large and carefully sculpted stone structure are staggering. The process of building such a structure would be far more labor-intensive than previous monuments of mud-brick. This suggests that the state, and therefore the royal government, had a new level of control of resources, both material and human.  Also, from this point on, kings of the Old Kingdom are buried in the North, rather than at Abydos.

Although the plan of Djoser's pyramid complex is different from later complexes, many elements persist and the step pyramid sets the stage for later pyramids of the 4th, 5th, and 6th Dynasties, including the great pyramids of Giza. Though the Dynastic Egyptians themselves did not credit him as such, most Egyptologists credit Djoser's vizier Imhotep with the design and construction of the complex.

Precedents 
Djoser's Pyramid draws ideas from several precedents. The most relevant precedent is found at Saqqara mastaba 3038 ( 2700 BC). Three sides were extended and built out to create eight shallow steps rising at an angle of 49°. This would have been an elongated step pyramid if the remaining side had not been left uncovered. In another parallel to Djoser's complex, to complete this mastaba complex a niched enclosure wall was erected.

Layout 
Djoser's mortuary complex comprises the great trench, enclosure wall, colonnaded entrance, 'T' temple, Sed festival complex, north and south pavilions, south tomb and court, western mounds, mortuary temple, and the crowning feature of it all, the step pyramid with its substructure. The complex was a landmark achievement for Egyptian architecture. It was the advent of the pyramidal form of the royal tomb and the first instance of the mass use of limestone in construction, replacing mudbrick which had been the staple building material prior. This shift to limestone – a hard, dense material compared to mudbrick – presented novel challenges to the architects, though they kept to earlier tradition, copying architectonic elements and carving them into the stone. For example, the Egyptians hand-carved 1,680  -tall niches out of the limestone enclosure wall. In earlier projects, this element was built with wooden planks, ropes, and poles hung with reed mats. In a modern context, the same element would be built by laying out the blocks to form the recesses.

Step pyramid 
This element was revised repeatedly in construction, going through a series of developmental phases that culminated in its step pyramidal form. These phases are traditionally labelled, following Jean-Philippe Lauer's excavations: M1, M2, M3, P1, P1', and P2.

In the early stages (M1 to M3) the structure had the form of a mastaba before alterations (P1 to P2) were made to create its step pyramidal form. This was built from a core of limestone blocks arranged in horizontal beds and bound with yellow or red clay. The outer blocks were inclined to ~82° and the top of the mastaba likely had a slightly convex shape. A second casing of fine white limestone was applied to this which increased the mastaba's base length to  square (M2). The outer blocks of this second coat also had a steeper incline at ~76°.

Egyptologists are split on the motivations behind the conception of the pyramidal form that the mastaba was converted into. Lauer believed that the alteration was made to have the tomb visible from Memphis. The fact of the mastaba's square plan led Rainer Stadelmann, however, to suggest that it was never the intended final form and that it was planned to be a pyramid from the outset. The alteration from mastaba to pyramid came with a shift in construction. These leaned on each other from opposite ends providing greater stability preventing a collapse. The whole was then cased in fine white limestone with a layer of packing in between. The decision was then made to expand the pyramid north and west from four to six steps (P1') which was then finished with a final layer of limestone casing (P2) that gave the pyramid its final form.

Much of the rock for the pyramid was likely quarried from the construction of the great trench. It is widely accepted that ramps would have been used to raise heavy stone to construct the pyramid, and many plausible models have been suggested. For transport, apparatuses like rollers were used in which the heavy stone could be placed and then rolled.

Pyramid substructure 
Under the step pyramid is a labyrinth of tunneled chambers and galleries that total nearly 6 km in length and connect to a central shaft 7 m square and 28 m deep. These spaces provide room for the king's burial, the burial of family members, and the storage of goods and offerings. The entrance to the 28 m shaft was built on the north side of the pyramid, a trend that would remain throughout the Old Kingdom. The sides of the underground passages are limestone inlaid with blue faience tile to replicate reed matting. These "palace façade" walls are further decorated by panels decorated in low relief that show the king participating in the Heb-sed. Together these chambers constitute the funerary apartment that mimicked the palace and would serve as the living place of the royal ka. On the east side of the pyramid, eleven shafts 32 m deep were constructed and annexed to horizontal tunnels for royal family members. These were incorporated into the pre-existing substructure as it expanded eastward. In the storerooms along here over 40,000 stone vessels were found, many of which predate Djoser. These would have served Djoser's visceral needs in the afterlife. An extensive network of underground galleries was located to the north, west and south of the central burial chamber and crude horizontal magazines were carved into these.

Burial chamber 
The burial chamber was a vault constructed of four courses of well-dressed granite. It had one opening, which was sealed with a 3.5 ton block after the burial. No body was recovered as the tomb had been extensively robbed. Lauer believes that a burial chamber of alabaster existed before the one of granite. He found interesting evidence of limestone blocks with five pointed stars in low relief that were likely on the ceiling, indicating the first occurrence of what would become a tradition. The king sought to associate himself with the eternal North Stars that never set so as to ensure his rebirth and eternity.

Pyramid complex 

Djoser's Step Pyramid complex included several structures pivotal to its function in both life and the afterlife. A pyramid was not simply a grave in ancient Egypt. Its purpose was to facilitate a successful afterlife for the king so that he could be eternally reborn. The symbolism of the step pyramid form, which did not survive beyond the 3rd Dynasty, is unknown, but it has been suggested that it may be a monumental symbol of the crown, especially the royal mortuary cult, since seven small step pyramids (that were not tombs) were built in the provinces. Another well accepted theory is that it facilitated the king's ascension to join the eternal North Star.

The main modern excavator of the Step Pyramid was Jean-Philippe Lauer, a French architect who reconstructed key portions of the complex. Several features of the complex differ from those of later Old Kingdom pyramids. The pyramid temple is situated at the north side of the pyramid, whereas in later pyramids it is on the east side. Also, the Djoser complex is built on a north–south axis, whereas later complexes utilize an east–west axis. Furthermore, the Djoser complex has one niched enclosure wall, whereas later pyramids have two enclosure walls with the outside one being smooth and the inside one sometimes niched.

Great trench 
Before the enclosure wall, Djoser's pyramid complex is surrounded by a trench dug into the underlying rock. It is rectangular in shape, oriented on the north–south axis. The trench resembles a 𓉔 (hieroglyph h) which represents the floorplan of a house. It is decorated with niches which are suggested by Nabil Swelim to have hosted the spirits of members of the king's court, there to serve the king in his afterlife. In parts, the trench doubles into two with distinct entries. These make accessing the enclosure wall more difficult, indicating its function as a safe-guard. Miroslav Verner suspects that a single entrance was built at the south-east corner granting access to the area.

Enclosure wall 
This wall was built from a thick core of masonry that was encased with Tura limestone, wholly on the outside but partially on the inside. Fourteen of these bastions were larger than the rest. These hosted false double-doors, while a fifteenth situated in the south-east corner of the east façade held the real entrance. The entrance was flanked by two towers leading to a passage past which lay the colonnaded entrance.

The enclosure wall design recalls the appearance of First Dynasty tombs, such as those found directly north of the complex and at Abydos. Alan Spencer compares the design to the panelled construction of the palace façade, which imitates bound bundles of reeds. Jean-Philippe Lauer suggests that the wall was modelled after the 'White Walls' of Memphis, though Verner notes that the presence of so many doors renders this unlikely. Hermann Kees thought the fifteen doors were related to the sed festival and indicated its duration as being half a lunar month. The remaining doors are known as false doors, and were meant for the king's use in the afterlife. They functioned as portals through which the king's ka could pass between life and the afterlife.

Entrance colonnade 
The entrance colonnade led from the enclosure wall to the south court of the complex. It comprises two distinct passageways oriented approximately east–west. The ceiling blocks here were carved into the shape of tree trunks. This is followed by a wider corridor flanked by 40 limestone columns, arranged in pairs, that fronted projecting walls, which formed alcoves. They supported a limestone ceiling whose blocks carved again into the form of palm tree trunks. There are 24 alcoves which are suggested to have held statues of the king or perhaps, because of their number, a double statue of the king and a nome deity. Such statues are present in the monuments of the Fourth Dynasty, but no trace of them has been uncovered at Djoser's complex. The end walls of the alcoves had slits cut into them near the ceiling thus allow light to filter in. Near the beginning of the colonnade, at its eastern end, is a corridor which leads to the heb-sed court. Lauer believes this chamber contained a statue of Djoser on a pedestal that bore his name and Imhotep's titles. The torso and base of this statue were found in the entrance colonnade. The west wall of the entrance colonnade has the form of an open door which leads into the south court.

South court 
The south court is a large court between the south tomb and the pyramid. Within the court are curved stones thought to be territorial markers associated with the Heb-sed festival, an important ritual completed by Egyptian kings (typically after 30 years on the throne) to renew their powers. These would have allowed Djoser to claim control over all of Egypt, while its presence in the funerary complex would allow Djoser to continue to benefit from the ritual in the afterlife. At the southern end of the court was a platform approached by steps. It has been suggested that this was a platform for the double throne. This fits into the theory proposed by Barry Kemp, and generally accepted by many, that suggests the whole step pyramid complex symbolizes the royal palace enclosure and allows the king to eternally perform the rituals associated with kingship. At the very south of the South Court lay the South Tomb.

South tomb 

The south tomb has been likened to the satellite pyramids of later dynasties, and has been proposed to house the ka in the afterlife. Another proposal is that it may have held the canopic jar with the king's organs, but this does not follow later trends where the canopic jar is found in the same place as the body. These proposals stem from the fact that the granite burial vault is much too small to have facilitated an actual burial.

The substructure of the south tomb is entered through a tunnel-like corridor with a staircase that descends about 30 m before opening up into the pink granite burial chamber. The staircase then continues east and leads to a gallery that imitates the blue chambers below the step pyramid.

Current evidence suggests that the south tomb was finished before the pyramid. The symbolic king's inner palace, decorated in blue faience, is much more complete than that of the pyramid. Three chambers of this substructure are decorated in blue faience to imitate reed-mat facades, just like the pyramid. One room is decorated with three finely niche reliefs of the king, one depicting him running the Heb-sed. Importantly, Egyptian builders chose to employ their most skilled artisans and depict their finest art in the darkest, most inaccessible place in the complex. This highlights the fact that this impressive craftsmanship was not meant for the benefit of the living but was meant to ensure the king had all the tools necessary for a successful afterlife.

North temple and serdab court 
The northern (funerary/mortuary) temple was on the north side of the pyramid and faced the north stars, which the king wished to join in eternity. This structure provided a place in which the daily rituals and offerings to the dead could be performed, and was the cult center for the king. To the east of the temple is the serdab, which is a small enclosed structure that housed the ka statue. The king's ka inhabited the ka statue, in order to benefit from daily ceremonies like the opening of the mouth, a ceremony that allowed him to breathe and eat, and the burning of incense. He witnessed these ceremonies through two small eye holes cut in the north wall of the serdab. This temple appeared on the north side of the pyramid throughout the Third Dynasty, as the king wished to go north to become one of the eternal stars in the North Sky that never set. In the Fourth Dynasty, when there was a religious shift to an emphasis on rebirth and eternity achieved through the sun, the temple was moved to the east side of the pyramid, where the sun rises, so that through association the king may be reborn every day.

Heb-sed court 

The Heb-sed court is rectangular and parallel to the South Courtyard. It was meant to provide a space in which the king could perform the Heb-sed ritual in the afterlife. Flanking the east and west sides of the court are the remains of two groups of chapels, many of which are dummy buildings, of three different architectural styles. At the north and south ends there are three chapels with flat roofs and no columns. The remaining chapels on the west side are decorated with fluted columns and capitals flanked by leaves. Each of the chapels has a sanctuary accessed by a roofless passage with walls that depict false doors and latches. Some of these buildings have niches for statues. Egyptologists believe that these buildings were related to the important double coronation of the king during the Heb-sed.

See also 
 Egyptian pyramid construction techniques
 List of Egyptian pyramids

Notes

Citations

References

External links

Virtual exploration of the colonnade
Virtual exploration of the southern entrance of the Step Pyramid
Virtual exploration of the burial chamber

Buildings and structures completed in the 27th century BC
Former world's tallest buildings
Saqqara
Pyramids of the Third Dynasty of Egypt
Djoser
Ancient Egyptian step pyramids